Diego Alves Carreira (born 24 June 1985), known as Diego Alves, is a Brazilian professional footballer who plays as a goalkeeper for Spanish club RC Celta de Vigo.

Having begun his career at Atlético Mineiro, he spent most of it in Spain in the service of Almería and Valencia, making 269 La Liga appearances both teams combined during exactly one decade. A renowned penalty kick saver, he blocked a record 23 spot-kicks in Spain's top flight. Later in his career, he won several honours with Flamengo, including the Copa Libertadores in 2019.

Alves was part of the Brazilian squad which won a bronze medal at the 2008 Olympics, and made his senior international debut in 2011. He represented the latter at the Copa América Centenario.

He has also risen to popularity more recently for having conceded more goals (21) to Lionel Messi than any other keeper.

Club career

Atlético Mineiro / Almería
Alves was born in Rio de Janeiro. Having started professionally at Clube Atlético Mineiro, he moved to UD Almería on 24 July 2007, as the Andalusians had just achieved a first ever promotion to La Liga. Initially the backup to another newly signed, David Cobeño, he eventually became the undisputed starter, helping the club overachieve for a final eighth place in the league with notable performances against, among others, Real Madrid.

After Cobeño left for Rayo Vallecano in August 2008, Alves remained first-choice during 2008–09, but suffered an injury in the final stretch of the season. Fully recovered for the start of the following campaign, he played in all the matches (safe for 30 minutes against Valencia CF, after he had been sent off, and the last round against Sevilla FC as Almería were already saved from relegation); in April 2010, his agent stated a move away from the Estadio de los Juegos Mediterráneos was being considered.

On 20 November 2010, Alves was in goal as Almería lost 8–0 at home to FC Barcelona, a defeat which cost manager Juan Manuel Lillo his post. In mid-May 2011, after his team's top-flight relegation, Valencia chairman Manuel Llorente confirmed the signing of the player.

Valencia

Alves made his official debut for Valencia on 13 September 2011, in a 0–0 away draw against K.R.C. Genk in the group stage of the UEFA Champions League. He backed-up Vicente Guaita in the league, however, until Guaita picked up a serious hand injury.

Alves also appeared in the second Champions League group stage match, at home to Chelsea, where he had a series of superb saves, including a string of three in two minutes – two-point-blank against Ramires and Fernando Torres, and a third when Valencia man Víctor Ruiz accidentally diverted the ensuing corner towards his own goal – in an eventual 1–1 draw.

In July 2014, Alves signed a new five-year deal to run until 2019. In the last game of the season, that also marked his 100th league appearance for the club, away against former side Almería, he tore his cruciate ligament in the 72nd minute, later undergoing surgery and being sidelined until November.

Flamengo
On 17 July 2017, ten years after leaving for Europe, Alves joined Clube de Regatas do Flamengo until 2020. On 23 November 2017, in the first leg of the semi-finals of the Copa Sudamericana against Atlético Junior at the Maracanã Stadium, he suffered a broken collar bone after being hit by Yony González; he underwent surgery two days later, being expected to return in two months. With this injury Alves was an important absentee in the 2017 Copa Sudamericana Finals.

Alves played 62 games for Flamengo in 2019, as they won the Campeonato Carioca, Campeonato Brasileiro Série A and the Copa Libertadores. In the national championship, he made the Bola da Prata for the team of the tournament.

In 2020, Alves played less than half the games. He was infected with COVID-19 at the start of the year, and also suffered a 20-game shoulder injury against Santos FC. The youngster Hugo Souza emerged in his absence.

Celta
On 8 February 2023, Alves returned to Spain when he joined RC Celta de Vigo on a free transfer.

International career

Alves was chosen to represent Brazil at the 2008 Summer Olympics in Beijing, as backup to Renan. He did not receive any playing time during the competition, as the national team went on to win a bronze medal.

Alves made his debut for the full side on 10 November 2011, in a 2–0 friendly win with Gabon. He also played four days later, against Egypt (same score).

Alves was selected by coach Dunga for the 2015 Copa América in Chile, but withdrew due to a knee injury to be replaced by Neto. On 5 May 2016, he was named to a 23-man squad for the Copa América Centenario.

Style of play
Alves made his 15th penalty save against Sevilla FC on 25 January 2015, which took his record to 42.85% of all attempts faced. Widely regarded as a specialist in the matter, he once stated that a penalty is "a psychological battle between the goalkeeper and the taker".

On 9 May 2015, after denying Real Madrid's Cristiano Ronaldo, Alves became the goalkeeper with the most penalty saves in the history of the Spanish top flight with 16 out of 37, equalling Andoni Zubizarreta who saved 16 from 102. He surpassed the latter on 25 September 2016 during a 2–1 away win over CD Leganés, following it up with two saves the next weekend – including a spectacular block from an Antoine Griezmann shot – albeit in a 0–2 home loss to Atlético Madrid; upon his departure from Valencia in 2017, he had saved 23 spot kicks.

Career statistics

Club

International

Honours
Atlético Mineiro
Campeonato Brasileiro Série B: 2006
Campeonato Mineiro: 2007

Flamengo
Copa Libertadores: 2019, 2022
Recopa Sudamericana: 2020
Campeonato Brasileiro Série A: 2019, 2020
Copa do Brasil: 2022
Supercopa do Brasil: 2020, 2021
Campeonato Carioca: 2019, 2020, 2021

Brazil
Summer Olympic Games: Bronze medal 2008
Individual
Bola de Prata: 2019

References

External links

Valencia official profile

CiberChe biography and stats 

 

1985 births
Living people
Footballers from Rio de Janeiro (city)
Brazilian footballers
Association football goalkeepers
Campeonato Brasileiro Série A players
Clube Atlético Mineiro players
CR Flamengo footballers
La Liga players
UD Almería players
Valencia CF players
RC Celta de Vigo players
Brazil youth international footballers
Brazil under-20 international footballers
Brazil international footballers
Copa América Centenario players
Olympic footballers of Brazil
Footballers at the 2008 Summer Olympics
Olympic medalists in football
Medalists at the 2008 Summer Olympics
Olympic bronze medalists for Brazil
Brazilian expatriate footballers
Expatriate footballers in Spain
Brazilian expatriate sportspeople in Spain